Events in the year 2019 in the Democratic Republic of the Congo.

Incumbents

 President: 
Joseph Kabila (until 24 January)
Félix Tshisekedi (since 24 January)
 Prime Minister: Bruno Tshibala

Events

January
January 10 – The Independent National Electoral Commission declares that Félix Tshisekedi is the victor of the 30 December 2018 general election.
January 20 – The Constitutional Court rejects an appeal by Martin Fayulu challenging the result of the election.
January 24 – Tshisekedi is inaugurated as the 5th President of the DRC.

Deaths

1 January – Raymond Ramazani Baya, politician, Foreign Minister and Ambassador to France (b. 1943).
26 January – Ndaye Mulamba, footballer (b. 1948).
19 February – Abdoulaye Yerodia Ndombasi, politician, Minister of Foreign Affairs and Vice-President (b. 1933).

References

 
2010s in the Democratic Republic of the Congo
Years of the 21st century in the Democratic Republic of the Congo
Democratic Republic of the Congo
Democratic Republic of the Congo